Shiv Shanker (born 2 May 1982) is an Indian former cricketer. He played two first-class matches for Hyderabad in 2008.

See also
 List of Hyderabad cricketers

References

External links
 

1982 births
Living people
Indian cricketers
Hyderabad cricketers
Cricketers from Hyderabad, India